The 1888 All-Ireland Senior Hurling Championship was the second staging of the All-Ireland hurling championship since its establishment by the Gaelic Athletic Association in 1887. The championship began on 27 May 1888; however, no All-Ireland final took place and the championship remains unfinished due to the North American invasion tour of Irish athletes, an unsuccessful attempt to raise funds for a revival of the Tailteann Games.

Tipperary were the defending champions; however, they were defeated in the provincial series.

Teams

A total of nine teams contested the championship, including four teams from the 1887 championship and five new entrants. Galway and Wexford did not field teams in the championship. Cork, Kildare, Laois, Limerick and Waterford all fielded teams in their respective provincial championships.

Team summaries

Format

For the first time the championship was organised on a provincial basis. Two separate championships were played in Leinster and Munster with the winners meeting in the All-Ireland final.

Leinster Championship

Semi-finals: (2 matches) The four participating teams make up the semi-final pairings.  Two teams are eliminated at this stage while the two winning teams advance to the Leinster final.

Final: (1 match) The winners of the two semi-finals contest this game.  One team is eliminated at this stage while the winners are declared Leinster champions and qualify for the All-Ireland final.

Munster Championship

Quarter-final: (1 match) This is a lone match between the first two team drawn from the province.  One team is eliminated at this stage while the winners advance to the semi-finals.

Semi-finals: (2 matches) The winners of the lone quarter-final join the three other teams to make up the semi-final pairings.  Two teams are eliminated at this stage while the two winning teams advance to the Munster final.

Final: (1 match) The winners of the two semi-finals contest this game.  One team is eliminated at this stage while the winners are declared Munster champions and qualify for the All-Ireland final.

All-Ireland Championship

Final: (1 match) The two provincial representatives from Leinster and Munster contest this game with the winners being declared All-Ireland champions.

Results

Leinster Senior Hurling Championship

Munster Senior Hurling Championship

All-Ireland Senior Hurling Championship

Championship statistics

Miscellaneous

 In the Leinster semi-final between Dublin and Kildare, J. J. Kenny deputised as referee when James O'Connor did not turn up.
 Despite losing to Tipperary in the opening round, Cork advanced to the Munster semi-final as Tipperary champions Clonoulty used players from other clubs to supplement their team. Such a format was not yet allowed. A replay was ordered in Cork but Clonoulty refused to play anywhere in Cork stating a preference for Kilmallock. As a result of their refusal to play they were disqualified.
 In the Munster final Cork were due to play Clare champions Ogonelloe, who had received a walkover from South Liberties of Limerick in the semi-final. Before the final commenced South Liberties took to the field to play Ogonelloe. The officials decided then not to play either game. It was then decided to play the final in Cork the following week but Clare refused to travel and Cork were awarded the title.

Sources

 Corry, Eoghan, The GAA Book of Lists (Hodder Headline Ireland, 2005).
 Donegan, Des, The Complete Handbook of Gaelic Games (DBA Publications Limited, 2005).

External links
 1888 All-Ireland Senior Hurling Championship results

References

1888
All-Ireland Senior Hurling Championships